The England–Ireland Professional Match was an annual men's professional golf competition between teams representing England and Ireland. It was played in 1932 and 1933 before the Irish Open. The matches followed the same form as the England–Scotland Professional Match that had been played just before the Open Championship. The match was played on a single day with 12 players in each team who played 6 foursomes and 12 singles matches. England won the first match 16–2 and the second match 13–3 after which the match was discontinued. The teams met again in 1938 as part of the Llandudno International Golf Trophy.

Results

Appearances
The following are those who played in at least one of the two matches. Bert Hodson played for Wales in the 1937 Triangular Professional Tournament and the 1938 Llandudno International Golf Trophy. Sydney Fairweather played for Scotland in the England–Scotland Professional Match in 1933, 1935, 1936 and in the Llandudno International Golf Trophy in 1938.

England
 Percy Alliss 1932
 Tom Barber 1932, 1933
 John Burton 1933
 Archie Compston 1932
 Bill Davies 1932, 1933
 Syd Easterbrook 1933
 Bert Gadd 1933
 Arthur Havers 1932, 1933 
 Bert Hodson 1933
 Bob Kenyon 1932
 Arthur Lacey 1932, 1933
 Alf Padgham 1932, 1933
 Alf Perry 1932
 Mark Seymour 1932, 1933
 Bill Twine 1932
 Charlie Ward 1932
 Charles Whitcombe 1933
 Ernest Whitcombe 1933

Ireland
 Denis Cassidy 1933
 Sydney Fairweather 1932
 John Hamill 1932, 1933
 Willie Holley 1932, 1933
 Paddy Mahon 1932, 1933
 Hugh McNeill 1932
 Joe McCartney 1932, 1933
 Matt McDermott 1932
 John McKenna 1933
 Willie Nolan 1932, 1933
 Pat O'Connor 1932, 1933
 Jack O'Neill 1933
 Moses O'Neill 1933
 Ernie Patterson 1932, 1933
 Charlie Pope 1932
 Philip Stevenson 1933
 Leo Wallace 1932

References

Team golf tournaments
Recurring sporting events established in 1932